Napier MRT station is an underground Mass Rapid Transit (MRT) station on the Thomson–East Coast line (TEL). Located in Tanglin, Singapore, the station is at the junction of Napier Road, Holland Road and Cluny Road. The two exits of the station serve Singapore Botanic Gardens and Gleneagles Hospital, along with the Ministry of Foreign Affairs and the surrounding embassies.

First announced in August 2012 as part of the Thomson line (TSL), the station was constructed as part of TEL Phase 3 (TEL 3) with the merger of the TSL and the Eastern Region line. The station opened on 13 November 2022. Fully designed by the Land Transport Authority, the station features an Art-in-Transit Botanical Art by the National Parks Board.

History 

The station was first announced on 29 August 2012 as part of the Thomson line (TSL). Contract T217 for the design and construction of Napier Station and associated tunnels was awarded to Sinohydro Corporation Ltd. (Singapore Branch) at S$189 million (US$ million) in November 2013. Construction started in 2014, with an expected completion date of 2021.

On 15 August 2014, the Land Transport Authority (LTA) announced that the TSL would merge with the Eastern Region line to form the Thomson–East Coast line (TEL). Napier station, part of the proposed line, would be constructed as part of TEL 3, consisting of 13 stations between Mount Pleasant and Gardens by the Bay. With restrictions imposed on construction due to the COVID-19 pandemic, the TEL3 completion date was pushed by one year to 2022. 

On 9 March 2022, Transport Minister S Iswaran announced in Parliament that TEL 3 would open in the second half of that year.

Description 

Napier station serves the TEL and is between the Stevens and Orchard Boulevard stations. The official station code is TE12. Being part of the TEL, the station is operated by SMRT Trains. Train frequencies on the TEL range from 5 to 6 minutes. 

The station is located at the junction of Napier Road and Cluny Road. Surrounding landmarks include: Gleneagles Hospital, the Ministry of Foreign Affairs, Australian High Commission, British High Commission, United States Embassy, INTERPOL Global Complex for Innovation and the Singapore Botanic Gardens.

Due to the site's space constraints, the station has a stacked side platform layout. To reflect its proximity to the Singapore Botanic Gardens, the station features a garden wall of indoor plants. The curvilinear ceiling at the columnless upper platform is inspired by a folding leaf. This curved motif is echoed on the walls of the lower platform. The station is fully designed by the LTA.

An Art-in-Transit artwork Botanical Art by the National Parks Board depicts a tapestry of various species of plants, including gingers, orchids and legumes. The artwork is adapted from the drawings by the de Alwis brothers, who were botanical artists commissioned to help Henry Nicholas Ridley, the then Director of the Gardens from 1888 to 1912. Besides educating the public on plants, the artwork is intended to show that plants can be "aesthetically pleasing" pieces of natural art.

References

External links

Mass Rapid Transit (Singapore) stations
Railway stations in Singapore opened in 2022